Roger Lagerfeldt is a male former international table tennis player from Sweden.

He won a bronze medal at the 1977 World Table Tennis Championships in the Swaythling Cup (men's team event) with Stellan Bengtsson, Kjell Johansson, Ake Gronlund and Ulf Thorsell for Sweden.

He also won a European Table Tennis Championships silver medal in 1976.

See also
 List of table tennis players
 List of World Table Tennis Championships medalists

References

Swedish male table tennis players
Living people
World Table Tennis Championships medalists
Year of birth missing (living people)